Adrian Lis (born 28 May 1992) is a Polish professional footballer who plays as a goalkeeper for Warta Poznań.

He scored his first Ekstraklasa goal on 6 February 2022, scoring deep into stoppage time as Warta Poznań recorded a 1–1 draw against Górnik Łęczna.

Career statistics

Club

References

External links

1992 births
Living people
Polish footballers
Association football goalkeepers
Warta Poznań players
Polonia Środa Wielkopolska players
Polonia Warsaw players
Footballers from Poznań
Ekstraklasa players
I liga players
II liga players
III liga players